My Pal, the King is a 1932 American Pre-Code Western film directed by Kurt Neumann, starring Tom Mix, and featuring Mickey Rooney and James Kirkwood. The screenplay concerns a rodeo cowboy who helps a child king.

Plot
Tom Reed's (Tom Mix) famous traveling Wild West show performs in Alvonia, a small European country, where the child king, ten year old Charles V (Mickey Rooney), neglects his duties because of his interest in the show.  After a discussion with Tom, Charles decides that he should treat his subjects fairly, which does not please Count De Mar (James Kirkwood) who has been in control of the country and wants to tax the people heavily. He plots with the Dowager Queen (Clarissa Selwynne) to kidnap Charles and his tutor, Dr. Lorenz (Wallis Clark), and throws them in a dungeon, and suggests to Lorenz that he kill Charles and then kill himself.  Tom learns from Charles' aunt, Princess Elsa (Noel Francis) that the king is missing, and Tom manages to track him to the fortress where the king is imprisoned.  Tom's cowboys and the count's men fight, and the count ends up drowning to death.  Tom then rescues the king and his tutor, and Charles promises to always treat his people well.

Cast
 Tom Mix as Tom Reed  
 Mickey Rooney as King Charles V 
 James Kirkwood as Count De Mar  
 Wallis Clark as Dr. Lorenz  
 Noel Francis as Princess Elsa  
 Finis Barton as Gretchen  
 Paul Hurst as Red  
 Stuart Holmes as Count Kluckstein  
 Jim Thorpe as Black Cloud  
 Christian J. Frank as Jailer Etzel  
 Clarissa Selwynne as Dowager Queen  
 Ferdinand Schumann-Heink as General Wiedeman (uncredited)
 Tony Jr. as Tom's horse
 Harry Cording as Palace Guard (uncredited)

References

External links
 
 
 

1932 films
1932 Western (genre) films
American Western (genre) films
Films directed by Kurt Neumann
Universal Pictures films
American black-and-white films
Films set in Europe
Films set in a fictional country
1930s English-language films
1930s American films
Films with screenplays by Richard Schayer
Films about kings